Love & the Outcome is a Canadian contemporary Christian music husband-wife duo from Winnipeg, Manitoba. They are on the Word Records label, and released their first album entitled Love & the Outcome on August 27, 2013. The album has had chart successes, and positive critical reception. They have appeared on three WOW Hits: "He Is With Us" on WOW Hits 2015; "King of My Heart" on WOW Hits 2016; and "The God I Know" on WOW Hits 2017.

Background
On July 7, 2012, Love & the Outcome was formed in Winnipeg, Manitoba, Canada. The duo consists of husband Chris Rademaker and wife Jodi King.

Music
In 2013, the duo was signed to Word Records, a major Christian music label in the United States.

On August 27, 2013, Love & the Outcome released their eponymously name Love & the Outcome. Love & the Outcome charted at No. 28 and No. 18 on the Top Christian Albums and the Top Heatseekers Albums charts respectively, for the Billboard charting week of September 14, 2013.

Love & the Outcome was part of the Winter Jam Tour 2015 West Coast.

On September 23, 2016, Love & the Outcome released These Are the Days, their second studio album. It peaked at No. 17 on both the Top Christian Albums and the Top Heatseekers Albums charts for the Billboard charting week of October 15, 2016.

In December 2016, the band toured with NewSong and Matthew West on the Very Merry Christmas Tour.

Members
 Jodi King – vocals, keys, percussion 
 Chris Rademaker – bass guitar, vocals

Discography

Studio albums

Extended plays

Singles

Awards and nominations
They won the 2013 GMA Canada Covenant Award for New Artist of the Year. They also received a Dove Award nomination for 'New Artist of the Year' in 2014.

References

External links
 

Musical groups established in 2012
Musical groups from Winnipeg
Word Records artists
Married couples
Canadian Christian rock groups
Canadian musical duos
2012 establishments in Manitoba